Augusto Chaves Batista (15 June 1916 – 30 November 1967) was a  Brazilian mycologist. He published more than 600 research papers, either alone or in collaboration with others. At the time of his death at the age of 51, Batista was the director of the Instituto de Micologia of the Federal University of Pernambuco.

Eponymous taxa
Several taxa have been named in his honor, including Batistia, published by Raffaele Ciferri, a frequent collaborator.
Antennulariella batistae
Batistaella
Batistamnus
Batistia
Batistiaceae
Batistina
Batistinula
Batistopsora
Batistospora
Candida batistae
Capnobatista
Capnodium batistae
Catenulaster batistae
Collybia batistae
Cyclotheca batistae
Enterographa batistae
Russula batistae

See also
List of mycologists

References

1916 births
1967 deaths
Brazilian mycologists
20th-century Brazilian botanists